Broadway Shopping Centre is a shopping centre in Sydney, located in the Broadway locality. It features a 500-seat Food Court and Hoyts 12-screen cinema complex along with  major retailers Kmart, Coles, Target, Aldi, Dymocks Booksellers, JB Hi-Fi, Harvey Norman, Harris Farm Markets, Rebel Sport, and over 100 specialty shops.

History 
The Broadway shopping centre is located in one of the two former Grace Bros Broadway buildings which opened in 1923, the other building now housing university student accommodation. Walker Corporation undertook the restoration of the buildings to include university student accommodation and a shopping centre in 1997. The shopping centre opened in 1998 and was owned and managed by Walker Corporation until its sale to Mirvac in December 2006. In 2007, an additional floor was added to the original centre

In 2015, major upgrades to the centre commenced, costing $55 million. The upgrades, completed in August 2016, added  a revamped food court, and new fashion stores.

Incidents
On 12 February 2008, just after 1:30 pm a fire was reported due to an electrical substation fire in the lower levels of the shopping centre. No one was injured, however emergency services rescued shoppers trapped in lifts, which had no power due to the fire.

On 17 June 2012, 69 year-old centre security guard Hans Schulz (a German native) was kicked to death after disturbing two intruders - a 32-year-old man from Randwick, New South Wales and a woman aged 27 from Maroubra, New South Wales - who had broken into a Wendy's Ice Cream Kiosk on the ground floor of the building. The pair were charged with manslaughter

On 29 April 2016, hundreds of shoppers and workers had to be evacuated, after a fire broke out on level three.

References

External links 
 
 Lonely Planet Guide

Shopping centres in Sydney
Shopping malls established in 1988
1923 establishments in Australia
Ultimo, New South Wales
Glebe, New South Wales